Fabián Huaiquimán (born 20 July 1998) is a Chilean karateka. He won the silver medal in the men's kumite 84 kg event at the 2021 World Karate Championships held in Dubai, United Arab Emirates.

He competed in the men's kumite 84 kg event at the 2022 World Games held in Birmingham, United States.

References 

Living people
1998 births
Place of birth missing (living people)
Chilean male karateka
Competitors at the 2022 World Games
21st-century Chilean people